Lauren Molina (born April 15, 1981) is an American actress, singer, songwriter, and musician. She is a co-creator and performer with the comedy-pop, undie-rock band The Skivvies. Her Broadway credits include Johanna in the actor-musician revival of Sweeney Todd. To describe her as an actress, one reviewer said "She's part Mary Martin, Lucille Ball, Kristen Wiig and [fill in the blank with your favorite opera star because Molina has one of the most powerful and flexible voices in the annals of Broadway]."
While performing on the first national tour of Sweeney Todd, she received the Independent Reviewers of New England (IRNE) Award for Best Supporting Actress. She won a Helen Hayes award for her portrayal of Cunegunde in Candide (2010-2011), directed by Mary Zimmerman at the Shakespeare Theatre in DC, and received an IRNE nomination for the same role at the Huntington Theatre. She originated the role of Bella Rose in Desperate Measures (2017-2018) Off-Broadway and received nominations for the Lucille Lortel Award for Outstanding Actress in a Musical  and Outer Critics Circle for Best Supporting Actress. In 2019, she and her Skivvies partner Nick Cearley co-conceived a new actor-musician revival of "You're a Good Man, Charlie Brown", also playing Lucy and Linus, at the Cincinnati Playhouse in the Park.
A Detroit native, Lauren received her BFA from the University of Michigan in musical theatre. She resides in New York City.

Stage career 
She made her Broadway debut as Johanna in the 2005 revival of Sweeney Todd, Described as a "sweet-voiced soprano who...plays the cello beautifully" by The New York Times, she received the Independent Reviewers of New England Award Best Supporting Actress, while performing on the first national tour, and was named as one of the "30 Under 30" featured on Broadwayspace.com.

Hilton Als, featured Molina in the "Critic's Notebook" of The New Yorker, saying "Most of the kudos for the current revival of Stephen Sondheim’s 1979 musical, “Sweeney Todd,” have gone to Patti LuPone and Michael Cerveris. But Lauren Molina also deserves her share. Making her Broadway début as Johanna, Sweeney's long-lost daughter, Molina projects such sweet confusion, mental terror, and consistent interiority that she exposes the ways in which seasoned pros like LuPone and Cerveris play to the audience from time to time. Molina is a newcomer—she only recently graduated from college—but she taps into Johanna with an all-consuming honesty and range. Given her unconventional good looks and delicacy of frame, filmmakers in the sixties and seventies like Lumet, Coppola, and others would have snatched Molina up as quickly as they did the late, great Elizabeth Hartman, who conveyed an effect similar to Molina's in “The Group,” “You’re a Big Boy Now,” and “The Beguiled” —that of a highly intelligent actress in love with being someone other than herself."

In 2008, she originated the role of Regina/Candi in the 80's rock musical Rock of Ages off-Broadway at New World Stages. She played the same role on Broadway from April 2009 – August 2010. She won a Helen Hayes Award for the role of Cunegonde in Candide in a 2010–11 production that was newly adapted and directed by Mary Zimmerman at the Goodman Theatre, Chicago, the Shakespeare Theatre, Washington D.C., and The Huntington Theatre in Boston.

She was also a part of the Drama League Nominated, two person revival of Stephen Sondheim's Marry Me A Little with Jason Tam, off-Broadway at the Clurman Theatre with Keen Company. The cast album was recorded by Ghostlight/Sh-K-Boom and released November 2013.

In 2017, Lauren originated the role of Bella Rose in the Drama Desk Award-Winning Off-Broadway show Desperate Measures. She received the Lucille Lortel Award for Outstanding Actress in a Musical and Outer Critics Circle for Best Supporting Actress nominations. 
Broadway world said, "...Lauren Molina, as Bella, gives one of those uproarious performances that used to make people stay home on Saturday nights to see on "The Carol Burnett Show." She mugs unmercifully, belts out a sassy strip number and, [has an] homage to Groucho and Harpo's classic mirror scene in "Duck Soup."

The show began at the York Theatre then transferred to New World Stages. She recorded the original cast album released by Sony Masterworks.

She is a co-conceiver of the new actor-musician revisal of “You're a Good Man, Charlie Brown” which debuted at the Cincinnati Playhouse in April 2019. She also played the role of Lucy and was described by the Cincinnati Enquirer as "a powerhouse of a performer". Critics raved that “The production at Cincinnati Playhouse in the Park may be the best we are likely to ever encounter, thanks to the inventiveness of the presentation and the talented cast.” 

She has been seen regionally as Squeaky Fromme in Assassins directed by James Bundy (Yale Rep), Eileen in Wonderful Town directed by Mary Zimmerman (Goodman Theatre), Countess in A Little Night Music directed by Peter DuBois (Huntington Theatre Company), Audrey in Little Shop of Horrors directed by Amanda Dehnert (Cleveland Play House), Janet in The Rocky Horror Show directed by Hunter Foster (Bucks County Playhouse), The World Premiere of Meet Me In Saint Louis: A Radio Play directed by Gordon Greenberg (Bucks County Playhouse) and It's a Wonderful Life: A Radio Play directed by Gordon Greenberg (Bucks County Playhouse).

Other roles she's originated include: Megan in the world premiere musical, NOBODY LOVES YOU, at both The Old Globe and off-Broadway at Second Stage in 2013; Miss Jones 1 in TEN CENTS A DANCE, with Donna McKechnie and Malcolm Gets at the Williamstown Theatre Festival (This original musical, created by John Doyle, utilized actor/singer/musicians, Lauren playing cello, bass, guitar, ukulele and saxophone, and expressed the story thru the music of Rodgers and Hart); Liza in THE FORTRESS OF SOLITUDE by Itamar Moses and Michael Friedman.

She was a featured singer at "The Ladies Who Sing Sondheim" concert with Barbara Cook and Patti Lupone at the Westport Playhouse. She also was a soloist at the "Tribute for Angela Lansbury" with Tyne Daly and Christine Ebersole held at the Bucks County Playhouse. In addition, she was a back-up singer for Sarah Brightman on her La Luna tour.

Music
Molina's vocal diversity ranges from pop belting to coloratura soprano. She can often be found singing in New York City and across the country with her wit-rock comedy-pop duo The Skivvies. Lauren and her Skivvies bandmate, Nick Cearley, played Brad and Janet in The Rocky Horror Show at the Bucks County Playhouse directed by Hunter Foster in 2013.

In 2007, Molina released her first EP entitled "Doo-Be-Doo". Featuring all original folk/pop songs, this album is quirky and playful, with instrumentations such as ukulele, cello, guitar, piano, and accordion. In 2010, she released "Sea For Two" her first full-length album through the indy label Mother West.

Molina has been a frequent collaborator with Jason Reischel, the Singer-Songwriter behind "My Cousin, The Emperor".  In 2007, she played cello on the song "Pieces Fall in Place" for Reischel's solo album Irony-Free Parlor Music.  Molina also appeared on the My Cousin, The Emperor songs Annie (The Levee Song) (cello) and Somedays (cello/vocals) from their 2011 EP The Subway Eps, Vol. I: Prospect Park West.

Videos from live performances can be found on her youtube channel.

Comedy
Molina created a webseries entitled "Rock of Ages Productions" along with former Rock of Ages castmates Mitchell Jarvis and Wesley Taylor. This absurd backstage mocumentary has 17 episodes and can be watched on YouTube at www.youtube.com/rockofagesprod.

External links
 
 Broadwayworld.com Profile
 
 The Skivvies Official Website
 The Skivvies

References

 Jones, Kenneth. Lauren Molina and Geoff Packard are Optimists of Goodman Candide. playbill.com September 17, 2010
 Brantley, Ben. Grand Guignol, Spare and Stark. nytimes.com November 4, 2005
 http://www.cdbaby.com/cd/laurenmolina cdbaby.com
 Isherwood, Charles. Big-Hair Rockers Return in a New Arena:Broadway April 8, 2009
 Hetrick, Adam.  July 29, 2011
 Teachout, Terry.  October 4, 2011
 Hoffman, Barbara.  June 13, 2013

Living people
1981 births
American musical theatre actresses
American women singer-songwriters
People from New York City
University of Michigan School of Music, Theatre & Dance alumni
21st-century American women
Singer-songwriters from New York (state)